Emerge may refer to:

 Emerge: The Best of Neocolours, the fourth album of Neocolours
 Emerge Desktop, a Desktop shell replacement for Microsoft Windows
 Emerge (magazine), a defunct news magazine
 Emerge Stimulation Drink, a drink sold in UK Supermarkets
 "Emerge" (song), a song by Fischerspooner
 emerge, a command-line tool at the heart of the Portage package management system
 Emerge, a frontend for the diff and diff3 commands for Emacs

See also
Emergence, a concept in philosophy, systems theory and science